The Upper Harz Ditches are hillside ditches, running roughly parallel to the contour lines, that were laid out in the Upper Harz in Germany from the 16th to the 19th centuries to supply water power to the silver mines there. They are an important component of the Upper Harz Water Regale, a historical water system that is now a cultural monument.

Design 
The ditches consist of a trench and an embankment (Grabenbrust) next to it, made of spoil piled up when the ditch was excavated. The embankments are frequently protected from erosion by a dry stone wall. In most cases, they also act as inspection paths for the ditch keepers (Grabenwärter) and, today, as public footpaths. The ditches are only inclined at about 1–2 ‰ (i.e. about 1 to 2 millimetres per metre). As a result, they run almost parallel to the contour lines of the terrain.

As protection against seepage the embankment and bed of the ditch are usually sealed with grass sods or clay. At inlets, where the ditch crosses forest streams, there are so-called Fehlschläge, small weirs, by which the water flow in the ditch can be regulated. When water levels are high these have to be opened, i.e. the boards controlling the flow must be removed.

The hydraulic capacity of most ditches is between 100 and 200 litres per second; on the Rehberg Ditch it is up to 600 L/s and on the Dyke Ditch up to 1000 L/s.

List of the Upper Harz ditches 

The ditches are listed in an order which is based on the system by Preussag, who named the ditches in an order based on the power stations that could be supplied by them. At present only those working ditches still operated by the Harzwasserwerke are shown.

See also 

 Upper Harz
 Upper Harz Water Regale
 Upper Harz Ponds
 Upper Harz Water Tunnels
 Kunstgraben

Sources

External links 

 Upper Harz Water Regale (German)

Aqueducts in Germany
 
Kunstgraben